The 1951 Detroit Lions season was their 22nd in the league. They were 7–4–1, tied for second in the National Conference, a half game behind the Los Angeles Rams. A loss at San Francisco in the regular season finale cost the Lions the conference title, and they failed to qualify for the playoffs for a sixteenth consecutive season. The team improved on their previous season's output of 6–6.

In their 52–35 win over the Green Bay Packers on Thanksgiving, Detroit became the first team in NFL history to score three touchdowns of 70 yards or more in one quarter (a run and two punt returns in the third period). It was the first of thirteen consecutive appearances for the Packers in Detroit on Thanksgiving, through 1963.

Regular season

Schedule 

 Monday night (October 8), Thursday (November 22: Thanksgiving)

Standings

References

External links 
1951 Detroit Lions at Pro Football Reference
1951 Detroit Lions at jt-sw.com

Detroit Lions seasons
Detroit Lions
Detroit Lions